Ganagapura (Deval Ganagapur) is a Village in Karnataka, India. It is located in the Afzalpur taluk of Kalaburagi district in Karnataka.The Village is noted for its Temple to Lord Dattatreya, who is said to have attained realization on the banks of the confluence (Sangama) of rivers Bhima-Amarja.

Demographics
In India's 2001 census, Ganagapura had a population of 6491, with 3250 males and 3241 females.

Religious significance
Ganagapura is a kshetra (place of pilgrimage) associated with Sri Narasimha Saraswati Swami, the second incarnation of Dattatreya.  According to the book Shri GuruCharitra, he promised that he would abide forever at Ganagapura.  In the morning, he would bathe at the confluence of the Bhima and Amarja rivers.  At midday, he would go through the village asking for bhiksha (alms of food), and accept pooja offerings in the form of Nirguna Paduka at the temple.  Devotees believe that by bathing at the confluence between 3.30 am to 4.30 am (brahma muhurtham ), studying the Shri GuruCharita book for 7 days (sapthaha, the chapters would be spread across 7 days) at the odumbara tree ( Fig tree) at the confluence,  by begging (Maadhukari) from at least five houses for 7 days in Ganagapura, and by offering Paduka Pooja at the temple, they can experience the living presence (darśana) of Sri Narasimha Saraswati Swami, and be freed from sins and granted wishes.

Places of interest
Significant places include Nirgun Math, Kalleshewar. The Nirguna Math is adorned with the Nirguna Padukas.

Sangam Kshetra – meeting point of Bhima and Amarja rivers, Audumbar Tree, Ash Hill etc.

Transportation
Ganagapur is well connected by road and rail. There are many state-run buses from Gulbarga to Ganagapur. The town is on the railway route. Travellers need to get down at the Ganagapur Road railway station, which is on Gulbarga-Mumbai route. The nearest airport is at Kalaburgi located 52 kilometres from Ganagapur.The roads have been repaired and improved by the Government of Karnataka. Pilgrims also from Maharashtra State can come via Solapur and Akkalkot. Both this places are having good connectivity to Ganagapur.

References

http://www.srikshetraganagapur.com 

Cities and towns in Kalaburagi district